The 2012 Angelo State Rams football represented Angelo State University in the 2012 NCAA Division II football season as a member of the Lone Star Conference.

Schedule

References

Angelo State
Angelo State Rams football seasons
Angelo State Rams football